Manly Hospital provided medical services to the Northern Beaches area of Sydney, Australia before the transfer of services to Northern Beaches Hospital. The Northern Sydney Local Health District managed Manly Hospital.

History
Manly Hospital was established in 1896 on the corner of Raglan Street and Quinton Road, as a result of enthusiastic fundraising by William Horner Fletcher and a government subsidy. Originally known as the Manly Cottage Hospital, from 1929 it was referred to as the Manly District Hospital.

Future of Manly Hospital
The future of Manly and Mona Vale Hospitals had been the subject of considerable public debate.

In May 2013 the State Government announced the Northern Beaches Hospital would be built at Frenchs Forest. Upon its completion in 2018 it became the primary hospital for the Northern Beaches, with Manly Hospital closing on October 30, 2018.

In 2018 a proposal to build Australia's first hospice for young adults on the hospital site was announced.

In October 2020 public consultation on the Manly Hospital site closed and a planning proposal was submitted to council.

See also
List of hospitals in Australia

References

External links
Manly Hospital website - actual link/site (by zPiotrW)
 Satellite Photo of Manly Hospital on Google Maps

Hospitals in Sydney
Hospitals established in 1896
Manly, New South Wales
1896 establishments in Australia
2018 disestablishments in Australia
Former hospitals in Sydney